Thomas Scott Begich (born October 31, 1960) is an American politician and a former Democratic member of the Alaska Senate. He represented District J from 2017 to 2023 and was elected twice without general election opposition. In 2022, his seat was redistricted, and Begich chose to withdraw his candidacy for the seat.

Career
Begich is a musician and author. He has released six albums and has performed in venues across the country. He is also the author of a book of poetry, "Six Truths, Fifty Sonnets." He was a delegate to the 2004 Democratic National Convention.

Personal life
Tom Begich's father was Nick Begich, a member of the United States House of Representatives. His brother, Mark, was a member of the United States Senate and his brother Nick Jr., is a conspiracy theorist author, scientist, and researcher. Tom Begich's uncle, Joseph Begich, served 18 years in the Minnesota House of Representatives. Begich's wife, Sarah Sledge, is a singer and songwriter.

References

External links
 Official page at the Alaska Legislature

1960 births
21st-century American politicians
Bard College alumni
Begich family
Democratic Party Alaska state senators
Living people
Politicians from Anchorage, Alaska